Wang Yu-lian (born 6 September 1994) is a Taiwanese swimmer. He competed in the men's 100 metre freestyle event at the 2017 World Aquatics Championships. In 2019, he represented Chinese Taipei at the 2019 World Aquatics Championships held in Gwangju, South Korea.

References

External links
 

1994 births
Living people
Taiwanese male freestyle swimmers
Place of birth missing (living people)
Swimmers at the 2014 Asian Games
Swimmers at the 2018 Asian Games
Asian Games competitors for Chinese Taipei
Competitors at the 2013 Summer Universiade
Competitors at the 2015 Summer Universiade
Competitors at the 2017 Summer Universiade